Mahler is a German occupational surname. Mahler was a variant spelling of Maler ("painter"), particularly a stained glass painter.

The name most often refers to Gustav Mahler, Bohemian-Austrian composer and conductor. His family included:

 Alma Mahler-Werfel (1879–1964), Austrian socialite and wife of, successively, Gustav Mahler, Walter Gropius and Franz Werfel 
 Anna Mahler (1904–1988), Austrian-UK sculptor, daughter of Gustav and Alma Mahler
 Fritz Mahler (1901–1973), Austrian conductor, and cousin once removed of Gustav Mahler
 Otto Mahler (1873–1895), Bohemian-Austrian musician and youngest brother of Gustav Mahler
 Joseph Mahler (1900–1981), inventor of the Vectograph stereoscopic technique, cousin of Gustav Mahler
 Zdeněk Mahler (1936–2018), Czech pedagogue, writer, publicist and musicologist, distantly related with Gustav Mahler

Other people named Mahler include:
 Arthur Mahler (1871–1944), Austrian archeologist
 Bruce Mahler (born 1950), American actor
 Eduard Mahler (1857–1945), Hungarian-Austrian orientalist, astronomer, natural scientist
 Gregory Mahler (born 1950), American political scientist
 Henry Mahler (1921–1983), Austrian-American biochemist
 Halfdan T. Mahler (1923–2016), Danish physician
 Hedwig Courths-Mahler (1867–1950), German writer
 Horst Mahler (born 1936), German lawyer and political extremist
 Kurt Mahler (1903–1988), German-British mathematician
 Leslie Mahler (1970-), American genealogist, FASG
 Margaret Mahler (1897–1985), Hungarian psychoanalytic child psychologist
 Mickey Mahler (born 1952), American baseball player
 Nicolas Mahler (born 1969) Austrian artist
 Raphael Mahler (1899–1977), Jewish historian from Poland, America, and Israel
 Rick Mahler (1953–2005), American baseball player
 Thomas Mahler, Austrian game developer and founder of Moon Studios
 Vincent A. Mahler (born 1949), American political scientist

See also
 Mahler (disambiguation)
 Maler

Notes 

German-language surnames
Jewish surnames
Yiddish-language surnames
Occupational surnames